Something Is Out There is a 1988 American science fiction television miniseries that aired on NBC, and a weekly series that followed in the fall of 1988, which lasted from October to December 1988.

Plot summary
Jack Breslin (Joseph Cortese) is a police officer investigating brutal murders in which organs have been removed from the victims. He learns that the crimes are being committed by a monstrous alien insectoid prisoner known as a xenomorph, possessing shape-shifting and physical possession abilities, who has escaped from an alien prison starship passing by the solar system, and he teams up with a beautiful medical officer from that ship, Ta'Ra (Maryam d'Abo), to track down the villain. Ta'Ra has assorted superhuman abilities, including telepathy and superhuman agility, which come in handy during the mission.

Cast
 Joe Cortese as Jack Breslin
 Maryam d'Abo as Ta'Ra
 George Dzundza as Frank Dileo
 Gregory Sierra as Victor Maldonado
 Kim Delaney as Mandy Estabrook
 John Putch as Wendle
 Robert Webber as Commissioner Estabrook
 Earl Billings as Coroner
 Michael DeLuise as Punk

Notes
The miniseries drew high ratings for NBC and critics noted the chemistry between Jack and Ta'Ra as one of its high points. One week after its ratings success, Brandon Tartikoff announced it would become a weekly series. 13 episodes were ordered.  Something Is Out There fared poorly opposite the very successful Dallas and the show was later moved to compete with Beauty and the Beast where ratings only worsened.  The series was canceled after only six one-hour episodes were broadcast, with two additional episodes produced but not broadcast at the time except in isolated cases in the US.

Due to its short run, the series is not often found in syndication, but the Sci-Fi Channel did include it as part of a rotation of short-lived series, including broadcasting the previously unaired episodes. An edited down version of the miniseries has aired as a syndicated television movie.

The one-hour episodes also appear occasionally at Crackle's website and on the app.

Development
Originally conceived by Frank Lupo in 1987 with the title Invader, NBC ordered a four-hour mini-series for broadcast on May 8, 1988 with a budget of $7.5 million.  Shooting took 41 days on locations in Los Angeles and Australia.

Producers John Ashley and Frank Lupo decided to alter the program's concept to cope with the comparatively smaller budget of the weekly series.  "Things definitely change fast when a mini-series or movie becomes a weekly series," said Ashley.  "It's great when you've got four hours, $7.5 million and the talents of Rick Baker and John Dykstra to play around with.  But what happens when you're suddenly cut to a million per episode budget, don't have the talents of Baker or Dykstra and have to take the mini-series concept to the next level while turning out an hour a week?  What happens is that you make changes."

It was decided to focus the show on the relationship between Jack and Ta'Ra, on Ta'Ra's special abilities and to reject a "monster of the week" approach.  Ta'Ra, who was later revealed to be from a distant planet called Zeton, chooses to stay on Earth posing as Jack's cousin.  The show strayed from its science-fiction origins with supernatural stories featuring telekinesis and telepathy.

"In the early episodes, we felt we had pulled our reins in too far. We discovered that many people were expecting an alien every week, because of the mini-series, and were being disappointed," said Ashley in an interview with Starlog during filming of the eighth episode. "What we were giving them just wasn't working. So, we took a step back and looked at what elements made the mini-series work and made the later episodes along the lines of where the show should have gone. We went back to basics. We brought the creature from the mini-series back for a two-part episode, gave Ta'Ra some additional powers and made the show more science fictional in nature."

The changes were not enough to draw audience members back however, and Something Is Out There was eventually cancelled.

Episodes
 Something Is Out There: (Two-part miniseries)  Air Date:5/8 and 5/9/88.
 Gladiator: An escaped criminal goes gunning for Jack, using armor and a gun stolen from Ta'Ra.Air date: 10/21/88.
 Don't Look Back: Jack and Ta'Ra try to help a child on the run from government agents and something darker.  Air Date:10/28/88.
 In His Own Image: A woman finds her missing brother's head as an exhibit in a wax museum.  Air Date:11/4/88.
 Night of the Visitors: Ta'Ra thinks she may have a way back home when she recognizes an author's description of his encounter with aliens. Air Date:11/25/88.
 A Message from Mr. Cool: A psychotic thinks he's getting messages from a ventriloquist's dummy. Air Date:12/2/88.
 Good Psychics Are Hard to Come By: Jack is assigned to work with a psychic on a kidnapping case, but is the man truly psychic or does his information come from a more criminal source? Air Date:12/9/88.
 A Hearse of Another Color: (Originally unaired) Jack's cousin begs the officer to help him track down a corpse missing from the mortuary he works at.
 The Keeper: (Originally unaired except in limited cases.) A seaside town becomes paralyzed by terror after one of its residents finds wreckage from Ta'Ra's spacecraft, creating a threat which could doom the Earth.

References

External links 
 
 
 

NBC original programming
1980s American science fiction television series
1988 American television series debuts
1988 American television series endings
Television series by Sony Pictures Television
Television miniseries as pilots
Australian science fiction television series
1980s American television miniseries
Films directed by Richard A. Colla
Television series created by Frank Lupo